Vic Dunlop (November 6, 1948 – August 13, 2011) was an American stand-up comedian and film and television actor.

Dunlop gained national attention appearing in such television series and films as Make Me Laugh, Match Game-Hollywood Squares Hour, The Richard Pryor Show, Harper Valley PTA, Skatetown, U.S.A., The Devil and Max Devlin, Martians Go Home and Night Patrol.

Dunlop died August 13, 2011 at age 62 from complications of diabetes.

References

External links

American male comedians
American stand-up comedians
American television personalities
American male film actors
American male television actors
Deaths from diabetes
1948 births
2011 deaths